The Achaemenid dynasty was an ancient Persian royal dynasty that ruled the Achaemenid Empire, an Iranian empire that stretched from Egypt and Southeastern Europe in the west to the Indus Valley in the east.

Origins 
The history of the Achaemenid dynasty is mainly known through Greek historians such as Herodotus, Ctesias, and Xenophon; the Hebrew Bible and other Jewish religious texts; and native Iranian sources. According to Herodotus, the Achaemenids were a clan from the tribe of the Pasargadae and probably settled surrounding the site of Pasargadae. They possibly ruled over other Persian tribes in the 9th century BCE.

Darius the Great traced his genealogy to Achaemenes, an unknown lineage named after . However, there is no evidence for a king called Achaemenes.

Dynasty
Kingship was hereditary within the Achaemenid dynasty. The last element of the King of Kings' title was always "an Achaemenid". Succession was designated by the King of Kings, and was usually the first-born son. From Darius I to Artaxerxes II, it was usually a synarchy between the father and the son.

Family tree

See also
 Achaemenid Empire
 Argead dynasty
 Teispids
 Kingdom of Cappadocia

References

Sources
 

 
Iranian dynasties
Babylonian dynasties
Monarchy in Persia and Iran